Brown bread is bread made with significant amounts of whole grain flour, usually wheat, and sometimes dark-coloured ingredients such as molasses or coffee. In Canada, Ireland and South Africa, it is whole wheat bread; in the Maritimes and New England, it is bread made with molasses. In some regions of the US, brown bread is called wheat bread to complement white bread.

Whole wheat flours that contain raw wheat germ, instead of toasted germ, have higher levels of glutathione, and thus result in lower loaf volumes.

History
In Ireland, during the Famine, prior to 1848, brown bread was handed out to the poor.  In England, brown bread was made from brown meal. Around and prior to the year 1845, brown meal was considered a less desirable grain product, and was priced accordingly. However, by 1865, due to recently discovered health benefits of bran, brown meal's London price had increased to a point often greater than that of fine flour.

Flour milling

Historically, brown meal was what remained after about 90% of the coarse, outer bran and 74% of pure endosperm or fine flour was removed from the whole grain. Using slightly different extraction numbers, brown meal, representing 20% of the whole grain, was itself composed of about 15% fine bran and 85% white flour. In 1848 it was asserted grain millers knew only of bran and endosperm, but by 1912 it was more widely known that brown meal included the germ.

Colour

The brown colour of whole grain breads is caused by cerealine, a discovery attributed to Hippolyte Mège-Mouriès of France. Cerealine, considered by Mouriès an active principal or ferment similar in action to diastase, came from the cereal layer of rectangular cells that millers considered a part of bran: later it was alternatively called the aleurone layer. In a statement attributed to Mouriès, if the cerealine is neutralized, white bread can be made from bran-containing flour.

Varieties

Irish

Irish wheaten bread is a form of Irish soda bread made with whole-wheat flour.

Borodinsky

Borodinsky bread is a slightly sweet sourdough rye bread of Russian origin, usually flavoured by caraway and coriander seeds and sweetened with molasses, which augments its already quite dark colour coming from the rye flour. It is named after the Battle of Borodino, and the legend says that it was invented by the widow of one of the Russian generals who died in that battle, though in reality it was probably created much later, at the end of the 19th century.

Boston

New England or Boston brown bread is a type of dark, slightly sweet steamed bread, usually sweetened with molasses, popular in New England. The moist bread is dark in colour and traditionally served with baked beans and franks.

Boston brown bread's colour comes from a mixture of flours, usually a mix of several of the following: cornmeal, rye, whole wheat, graham flour, and from the addition of sweeteners like molasses and maple syrup. Raisins are sometimes added. The batter is poured into a can, and steamed in a kettle.

Gallery

See also

 Anadama bread, a yeast bread of New England made with wheat, cornmeal, molasses, tan to brown in colour
 List of breads
 Malt loaf
 Pumpernickel, a dark brown bread of Germany
 Whole wheat bread
 Graham bread

References

External links
 
 Fannie Farmer 1918 recipe for brown bread
 Recipe for brown bread
 Epicurious recipe for Irish brown bread

Irish breads
Quick breads
New England cuisine
Vermont cuisine
Wheat breads